Elayirampannai is a panchayat town in Virudhunagar district in the state of Tamil Nadu, India.  The economy of the town is based on manufacturing safety matches, crackers and agriculture.

Overview
Elayirampannai (Tamil:ஏழாயிரம்பண்ணை) has a history of more than 350 years. Once it was ruled by Zamindars who were palayakarars before the British rule.   Even today the descendants of Jaminthars are living in Elayirampannai.

Demographics
As of 2001 census, Elayirampannai had a population of 6,354.  Males constitute 48% of the population and females 52%.  Elayirampannai has an average literacy rate of 62%, higher than the national average of 59.5%: male literacy is 72%, and female literacy is 52%.  In Elayirampannai, 11% of the population is under 6 years of age.

Facilities
Government Hospital

Economy

The main business here is Agriculture and Safety Matches. Elayirampannai is a hub for Wax Safety matches in India.  Many MSME Safety matches units engaged in production of Wax Safety matches.

Transport

Bus Available from/to Sattur, Kovilpatti, Sankarankoil, Vembakottai

Nearest Railway Stations are Kovilpatti railway station (10 km) and Sattur(15 km)

Education
Schools:
 A Government aided Higher Secondary School under the management of Nadars, which was founded by some elders of Nadar community.
 A school run by the local church.
 An English medium school run by Thiru. Rajendran.

References

Cities and towns in Virudhunagar district
Palayam